"Slave" is the first single from Australian rock musician James Reyne’s third studio album Electric Digger Dandy released in 1991. It peaked at number 10 in Australia in June 1991.

Track listings
 CD Single/ 7”
 "Slave" (James Reyne, Jim Vallance) - 4:13
 "Outback Woman" - 3:38

 12"
A1 "Slave"	
B1 "Outback Woman" (Reyne, Tony Joe White)
B2 "I Will Walk Beside You" (Reyne, Simon Hussey)

Weekly charts

External links

References

1991 songs
1991 singles
James Reyne songs
Virgin Records singles
Songs written by Jim Vallance
Songs written by James Reyne